Joe Murray (1887-1944) was an Australian rugby league footballer who played in the 1900s, 1910s and 1920s. He played for Newtown and North Sydney in the NSWRL competition as a lock but also played as a second rower.

Playing career
Murray made his debut for Newtown in 1908 which was the inaugural year that the NSWRL competition began.  In 1910, Murray was a member of the Newtown side which won their first ever premiership drawing with South Sydney 4–4 in the grand final. Newtown were declared premiers after the match had concluded because they had finished the regular season in first place.  In 1912 and 1913, Murray represented New South Wales on 4 occasions.

War service
In 1915, Murray joined North Sydney and then enlisted in the AIF and went to the Great War. On 2 June 1917, Joe Murray was awarded the Distinguished Conduct Medal (D.C.M.) for bravery and devotion to duty during active service in France.

After the war, he returned to North Sydney for one last season in 1920. 

Joe Murray died at Gloucester House (RPA Hospital), Camperdown, New South Wales on 28 April 1944.

References

External links

1887 births
1944 deaths
Australian military personnel of World War I
Australian rugby league players
Newtown Jets players
North Sydney Bears players
New South Wales rugby league team players
Rugby league locks
Rugby league players from Sydney